The Thiel Gallery is an art museum in the Djurgården park area of Stockholm, Sweden. Represented are the members of the Artists Association (Konstnärsförbundet) from the early 1900s as well as one of the world's largest collections of works by Edvard Munch.

History
The museum was originally the private residence and art gallery of the banker and collector Ernest Thiel (1859–1947), who acquired art made by his contemporaries among Scandinavian artists, such as Bruno Liljefors, Anders Zorn, Eugène Jansson, and Edvard Munch. 

The house was built between 1904 and 1907, and  it was designed in the Art Nouveau style with white facades by  architect Ferdinand Boberg (1860–1946). The inauguration took place in March 1907. By 1922, Thiel had lost his fortune and he was forced to sell the villa, collection, and fixtures. The gallery was acquired by the state in 1924 and opened to public in 1926. Since then, the building has been rebuilt and modernized several times.

Gallery

See also
 List of museums in Stockholm

References

External links 

Art museums and galleries in Stockholm
Museums in Stockholm
Art museums established in 1926
1926 establishments in Sweden
Listed buildings in Stockholm